HD 76143 (HR 3537) is a high proper motion star located in the southern circumpolar constellation Volans. With an apparent magnitude of 5.33, its faintly visible to the naked eye. The star is located 173 light years away from the Solar System, but is drifting with a radial velocity of 40.5 km/s.

Properties
HD 76143 has a classification of  "F5 IV", which states its a F-type star that is beginning to evolve off the main sequence. It has 40% more mass than the Sun, but has 3.21 times the radius of the latter. It radiates at 17 solar luminosities at an effective temperature of 6,544 K, which gives it a yellowish-white hue. HD 76143 rotates at a high projected rotational velocity of 140 km/s, which gives it an equatorial bulge 10% larger than it's poles. The star has a faint 12 magnitude companion separated 36.7 arcseconds apart.

References 

Volans (constellation)
F-type subgiants
3537
76143
043414
Volantis, 43
Durchmusterung objects